A sit-down strike is a labour strike and a form of civil disobedience in which an organized group of workers, usually employed at factories or other centralized locations, take unauthorized or illegal possession of the workplace by "sitting down" at their stations.

The attraction of the tactic is that it prevents employers from replacing them with strikebreakers or removing equipment to transfer production to other locations. Neal Ascherson has commented that an additional attraction is that it emphasizes the role of workers in providing for the people and allows workers to in effect hold valuable machinery hostage as a bargaining chip.

History 
Workers have used the technique since the beginning of the 20th century in countries such as United States, Italy, Poland, Croatia, and France. The United Auto Workers staged successful sit-down strikes in the 1930s, most famously in the Flint Sit-Down Strike of 1936–1937. In Flint, Michigan, strikers occupied several General Motors plants for more than forty days, and repelled the efforts of the police and National Guard to retake them. A wave of sit-down strikes followed but diminished by the end of the decade as the courts and the National Labor Relations Board held that sit-down strikes were illegal and sit-down strikers could be fired (see the 1939 Supreme Court ruling in NLRB v. Fansteel Metallurgical Corp.). While some sit-down strikes still occur in the United States, they tend to be spontaneous and short-lived.

French workers engaged in a number of factory occupations in the wake of the French student revolt in May 1968. At one point more than twenty-five percent of French workers were on strike, many of them occupying their factories.

In 1973, the workers at the Triumph Motorcycles factory at Meriden, West Midlands, locked the new owners, NVT, out following the announcement of their plan to close Meriden. The sit-in lasted over a year until the British government intervened, the result of which was the formation of the Meriden Motorcycle Co-operative which produced Triumphs until their closure in 1983.

The sit-down strike was the inspiration for the sit-in, where an organized group of protesters would occupy an area in which they are not wanted by sitting and refuse to leave until their demands are met.

See also

 Timeline of labour issues and events
 Pen-down strike

References

Bibliography

 
 
 
 
 

Labor disputes
Civil disobedience
Protest tactics
Nonviolent occupation